The 2016 Kyrgyzstan League was the 25th season of Kyrgyzstan League, the Football Federation of Kyrgyz Republic's top division of association football. Alay Osh are the defending champions, having won the previous season.

Teams

Note: Table lists in alphabetical order.

League table

Results

First round

Second round

Top scorers

Hat-tricks

 4 Player scored 4 goals
 4 Player scored 5 goals

References

External links
 Rsssf.com Statistics.

Kyrgyzstan League seasons
1
Kyrgyzstan
Kyrgyzstan